The SNCF Class BB 7200 is a 1.5 kV DC electric locomotive operated by the SNCF in France. It is the DC version of the 'Nez Cassé' family of locomotives built between 1976 and 1985 by Alstom. SNCF Class BB 15000 is the AC version while the Class BB 22200 is a dual-voltage version. Another relative is the NS Class 1600 operated in the Netherlands, a DC locomotive based on the BB 7200. Intended primarily for passenger service, increasing numbers are being allocated for freight service with lower-geared bogies as passenger services are taken from locomotive-hauled coaches by TGV services. BB 7200 operations are limited to the French 1.5 kV DC electrified network in southeastern France, from Paris southwards. In 2016 48 were allocated to freight, 58 to intercity passenger service, 50 to regional passenger service, and two to auto-train service.

7209, 7210, 7308 and 7348 have all been destroyed in accidents. The class was originally numbered 7201 - 7440. Some have cast plates. 7411-7440 are fitted with regenerative brakes for use on the steep Maurienne line in the Alps.

Fourteen locomotives numbered 7311, 7312, 7314, 7325, 7326, 7327, 7330, 7331, 7332, 7335, 7337, 7339, 7341 and 7342 were modified for push-pull operation and become BB 7600 locomotives, to be operated on Transilien Paris – Montparnasse lines.

Names
Some of the class carry the name of a city in France:

Models
 This locomotive was reproduced in H0 scale by Jouef, Lima, Märklin and Roco.
 This locomotive was reproduced in N scale by Fleischmann and Minitrix.

References

07200
B-B locomotives
Alstom locomotives
MTE locomotives
1500 V DC locomotives
Standard gauge electric locomotives of France
Railway locomotives introduced in 1976
Passenger locomotives